The Fit Stop is a Canadian children's physical fitness television series which aired on CBC Television from 1974 to 1975.

Premise
This series promoted physical activities for children featuring guests from the sports and fitness fields. Inexpensive sports were featured during the series, and a course of increasingly strenuous exercises was introduced in the second season. Episodes included talking puppet characters by Noreen Young such as a football helmet, hockey helmet, a knapsack, a linament bottle and an old shoe.

Scheduling
This half-hour series was broadcast Tuesdays at 4:30 p.m. (Eastern) in two seasons, from 5 February to 4 June 1974 and from 31 December 1974 to 15 April 1975.

References

External links
 

CBC Television original programming
1974 Canadian television series debuts
1975 Canadian television series endings
1970s Canadian children's television series
Canadian television shows featuring puppetry
Exercise television shows